Jerome or Girolamo Frescobaldi (died 1518) was an Italian financier and textile merchant in Bruges and at the Scottish court. He was described as a "very good friend to the King of Scots". The Frescobaldi family were involved in artistic commissions in England and Scotland.

Career
Jerome, Jeronimus, or Hieronymus (Italian: Girolamo) Frescobaldi was a member of the internationally successful Florentine Frescobaldi family. He was described as a "Lombard" in Scottish records. Frescobaldi and his business partners in Bruges, the Gualterotti family, sponsored the voyage of Giovanni da Empoli from Lisbon to the Malabar Coast of India in 1503 and 1504, intending that he would be their agent in Calicut for the spice trade. Jerome seems to have mostly lived in Bruges and established a trading house in Antwerp in 1507 in order to raise credit.

Frescobaldi worked for James IV of Scotland and Margaret Tudor, and his name appears frequently in the published exchequer records and the manuscript household account. Frescobaldi arranged credit for Scottish clergy travelling in Europe, and was the factor for the foreign debts of Archbishop of St Andrews. He supplied fine textiles for costume, furnishing, and table linen. He was involved in imports from Bruges with a Scottish merchant and courtier, James Merchamestoun. Another Scottish merchant buying in Flanders for the king at this time was James Hommyll, who imported tapestries, and hosted a group of Africans apparently including Ellen More for the king in his house on Edinburgh's High Street.

In May 1503 his factor Julian Laci, also called "Julian the Lombard", was paid for purchases made in Flanders, including ermine fur for the collar of the king's gown, five chairs of estate or thrones upholstered in cloth of gold, velvet for another four chairs, and ironwork for the chairs, and 16 gilded pewter balls for the chairs. The chairs were made in Bruges and taken to Middelburg for shipping. Julian Laci also appears in the exchequer rolls, exempted from the export custom duty of Melrose wool.

From 1505 to 1507 Jerome Frescobaldi organised a series of purchases for James IV from a sum of Flemish money, spent in Flanders, probably in Bruges. This included a stick or length of cloth of gold, hanks of gold wire or thread, money for the purchase of great horses, books of gold leaf for illuminating manuscripts and charters, live quails and pheasants. He gave money to the king's envoys, the Carrick Pursuivant and Lyon Herald, and arranged for 1,000 gold ducats to be available in Venice for the king's son, Alexander Stewart, Archbishop of St Andrews. He arranged the payment for the Papal bulls to appoint the Archdeacon of Aberdeen.

The cloth of gold was used to make a coat for James IV and the remaining 11 ells were given to Margaret Tudor. The gold fabric was used with expensive velvet to make an important gown in March 1507. The historian Michelle Beer argues that this gown was made for Margaret's "churching" after her first pregnancy, a ceremony which marked her return to full participation in court life. Some of the gold wire was sent to Margaret Tudor while she was away on a pilgrimage to Whithorn in June 1507.

Frescobaldi and his steward Julian Laci were not always resident in Scotland, and a note in the royal accounts from 1504 mentions that the court embroiderer Nannik, or Nanynek Dierxsoun, had used drawn gold thread sent by Frescobaldi to embroider a chasuble but there was no one to ask the price.

The Frescobaldi family at the English court
Jerome Frescobaldi supplied some textiles for the coronation of Henry VII of England in 1485. His sons Filippo and Leonard Frescobaldi conducted similar business at the English court from 1511, where there were several other Italian merchants in residence. In 1516 Leonard Frescobaldi was given an annuity or pension by Henry VIII as a vendor of cloth of gold and silver, and he was made an usher of the king's chamber. Leonard had stood as a guarantor for Pietro Torrigiano when he was contracted to make the tomb of Margaret Beaufort in November 1511. A Netherlandish artist involved in the tomb project, Meynnart Wewyck had been in Scotland in 1502 and 1503 painting portraits.

Leonard Frescobaldi supplied damask gold thread to the king's embroiderer John Milner. He also supplied guns and military equipment to Henry VIII, including halberds, axes and handguns, 4,500 suits of armour, cables for the king's ships, and suite of twelve cannnons called the "Twelve Apostles". Some of this weaponry made have been used in France and against Scotland at the battle of Flodden. Cardinal Wolsey raised loans to pay for the armour and artillery purchases of Henry VIII from the Frescobaldi and Cavalcanti banks.

Jerome's son Francesco Frescobaldi is said to offered hospitality and employment to Thomas Cromwell in Florence around the year 1504, according to Matteo Bandello.

Frescobaldi and alum

Frescobaldi was accused of a grave charge by Pope Julius II, and James IV wrote to the Pope in his favour in February 1508, mentioning that Frescobaldi had been involved in the alum trade (essential in tanning and in cloth-dyeing as a mordant), and Philip I of Castile had pressured him to import alum so that he broke a monopoly. James IV wrote to Louis XII of France hoping that he would intervene in support of Frescobaldi.  The Frescobaldi and Gualterotti family partnership were importing Turkish alum to England and Flanders, resulting in a reduction in prices.

Henry VII also supported the Frescobaldi's role in the alum trade, contending that Julius II needed their support for a new Crusade. James IV  was also enthusiastic in his letters about a crusade against Turkish shipping in the Mediterranean Sea.

Scottish trade to 1513
In 1508 he sent more sticks of cloth of gold and arranged for the mending of some of the royal tapestries that had been burnt in a fire. The fire also damaged some of Margaret Tudor's clothes.

Frescobaldi contributed to the cost of tackle and rigging for a ship bought in Flanders. Some of the "say" fabric he sent to Scotland was used by the king's tailor Thomas Edgar to make streamers or pennants for the king's ships, including the Margaret.

In 1510 James IV wrote to the King of France, Louis XII, in Frescobaldi's favour, because rumours against him were circulating in the Papal court. 

Other Italians at the Scottish court at this time included a stone mason called Cressent and a priest and alchemist John Damian. James IV gave a licence to a Florentine merchant "Lactente" Altoviti to trade in Scotland in March 1513. 

In 1513, the Bishop of Caithness, who managed the royal households and fishings, sent Frescobaldi barrels of salmon which were exempted from customs duty.

Frescobaldi loaned money to Margaret of Austria, Duchess of Savoy, Governor of the Netherlands, on an inventory of some of her jewelled tableware, which he returned to her. The pieces were weighed and valued by the goldsmith Lieven van Lathem, a son of the painter Lieven van Lathem.

After the death of Jerome Frescobaldi, in May 1518 his sons Leonard, Francesco, Jehan, Pierre, and Philippe Frescobaldi took charge of his business in Bruges. The business in Antwerp collapsed in the same year.

Artistic connections
Frescobaldi supplied artists' materials to the Scottish court. Colours for painting sent from Flanders in 1508 cost the relatively large sum of £31 Scots. They may have been for a painter called "Piers" in the accounts, who has been tentatively identified as Peerken Bovelant, an apprentice of an Antwerp painter Goswijn van der Weyden. Piers was brought to Scotland in September 1505 by Andrew Halyburton, the trading agent or "Conservator of Scottish Privileges" in Middelburg. No details are known of his work, except his assistance in painting costumes and heraldry for tournaments including the Wild Knight and the Black Lady. Piers cut out letters or ciphers to decorate the bards of the king's horses from velvet and the cloth of gold supplied by Frescobaldi. The king gave him a salary and accommodation, and it is likely that Piers made portraits for the court. A portrait of James IV wearing a collar of St George from 1507 survives at Abbotsford. Piers returned to Flanders from Inverkeithing in July 1508.

His family also developed artistic connections in the Netherlands. In 1530 the painter Ambrosius Benson and a Spanish apothecary called Arigon were appointed to look after the affairs of his daughter Johanna or Jennette Frescobaldi. She married Guyot de Beaugrant. He was a sculptor in alabaster from the Duchy of Lorraine who worked for Margaret of Austria in Brussels and carved the story of Susannah and the Elders on a fireplace in the administration building of the "Liberty of Bruges" or Brugse Vrije, following the designs of Lancelot Blondeel. They moved to Spain in 1533.

References

External links
 Handlist of the Frescobaldi archive: Inventario dell’archivio Frescobaldi, Ilaria Marcelli 
 MUSEA BRUGGE: De Schepenkamer van het Brugse Vrije, and Gillis van Tilborgh
 British Library, Stowe MS 146, f.107, Leonard Frescobaldi's warrant for the cannon called the 'twelve apostles', and other bills 

Court of James IV of Scotland
Italian expatriates in Scotland
Italian expatriates in Belgium
16th-century Italian businesspeople
16th-century people of the Republic of Florence
Material culture of royal courts
1518 deaths